William Clifford Nugent (born 3 March 1929) is an English former professional footballer.

Nugent was playing non-league football for Headington United when Cardiff City manager Cyril Spiers spotted him and brought him to Ninian Park in January 1951. He did not make his debut for the club until the following season, in a 1–0 win over Hull City, but he eventually managed to force his way into the side during the 1953–54 season. He scored his first goal for Cardiff in a match against Wolverhampton Wanderers in January 1954. He helped the club avoid relegation on the final day of the season in the next season but injury ruled him out for all but one game during the 1955-56 campaign, making an incredible return the next year by scoring a hattrick during a 7-0 thrashing of Barnsley.

He left the club in November 1958 and signed for Mansfield Town where he spent two years before moving into non-league football with Weymouth.

References

1929 births
Living people
Footballers from Islington (district)
English footballers
Association football wingers
Oxford United F.C. players
Cardiff City F.C. players
Mansfield Town F.C. players
Weymouth F.C. players
English Football League players